Saint-Pantaly-d'Ans (Limousin: Sent Pantali d'Ans) is a former commune in the Dordogne department in Nouvelle-Aquitaine in southwestern France. On 1 January 2017, it was merged into the new commune Cubjac-Auvézère-Val d'Ans.

Population

See also
Communes of the Dordogne department

References

Former communes of Dordogne